Abovce is a village and municipality in the Rimavská Sobota District of the Banská Bystrica Region of Slovakia. The village retains its agricultural character. Most important sightseeing is a village manor house.

History
In 2010 had been the settlement from the Bronze Age.
In historical records, the village was first mentioned in 1339 (Abafalwa) when it belonged to the local noble family Abaffy. In 1380 name of the village is Hanua. In 15th and 16th centuries it suffered devastation and afterwards many epidemics beat its inhabitants. From 1938 to 1945 it belonged to Hungary under the First Vienna Award. In the village are community centre, mourning house, elementary school, kindergarten, espresso bar and petrol station.

Genealogical resources

The records for genealogical research are available at the state archive "Statny Archiv in Banska Bystrica, Slovakia"

 Roman Catholic church records (births/marriages/deaths): ????-???? (parish: Putnok, Hungary)
 Reformated church records (births/marriages/deaths): 1730-1895
 Lutheran church records (births/marriages/deaths): 1778-1899
 Census records 1869 of Abovce are not available at the state archive.

See also
 List of municipalities and towns in Slovakia

References

External links
News about Abovce
https://web.archive.org/web/20060819115338/http://www.abovce.ou.sk/
http://www.e-obce.sk/obec/abovce/abovce.html
Surnames of living people in Abovce
Abovce Photo gallery

Villages and municipalities in Rimavská Sobota District
Hungarian communities in Slovakia